Heitor Villa-Lobos's Étude No. 11, one of his Twelve Études for Guitar, was first published by Max Eschig, Paris, in 1953.

Structure
The piece is in E minor and is marked Lent – Animé – Poco meno – Animé – Lent.

Analysis
Étude No. 11 is a study in arpeggios and chords, involving difficult left-hand stretches and an unusual emphasis on the use of the right-hand thumb. Like the preceding and following studies (and unlike the earlier ones), it is in ternary (ABA) form, with bell-like effects marking the middle section.

References

Cited sources

Further reading
 Villa-Lobos, sua obra. 1989. Third edition. Rio de Janeiro: MinC-SPHAN/Pró-Memória, Museu Villa-Lobos. Online edition, 2009
 Wright, Simon. 1992. Villa-Lobos. Oxford Studies of Composers. Oxford and New York: Oxford University Press.  (cloth);  (pbk).

Compositions by Heitor Villa-Lobos
Guitar études
Compositions in E minor